Constraints is a quarterly peer reviewed, scientific journal, focused on constraint programming, constraint satisfaction and optimization. It is published by Springer and was founded in 1996. Its 2018 impact factor is 1.106.

Abstracting and indexing 
The journal is abstracted and indexed in:

References 

Computer science journals
English-language journals
Publications established in 1996
Springer Science+Business Media academic journals
Quarterly journals